AXN was an Indian pay television channel that was owned by Sony Pictures Networks. Funded through advertising and subscription fees, AXN primarily focused on action genre and reality programming.

History
AXN launched in the Indian subcontinent on 8 January 1999 as a flagship feed of AXN Asia. During the channel's early years it operated as a genre-based network, airing mainly action films, action programmes, action animation and action sports.

Facing tough competition from rival networks Zee Café and Star World and a precipitous decline in the international syndication market for fictional action series and films, the channel shifted in mid-2005 by gradually incorporating more and more drama and comedy based programs into its schedule in order to attract more viewers and replicate the success shows such as Friends (comedy) and Law & Order (drama) had found on other channels. Big acquisitions included 24 and the CSI franchise.

The channel's high-definition feed was launched on 6 April 2015, which carried the same schedule as the SD feed but with different commercials.

Rebranding

The channel underwent a rebranding on 24 January 2016 with the addition of the slogan Live R.E.D standing for Reality, Entertainment and Drama. During the premiering Billions with this transformation, the channel sought to further diversify its portfolio away from its action genre by airing action shows with more intense, smart and unexpected characters.

To further its mission of diversification, the channel forged a multi-year deal with CBS Studios in July 2014, acquiring exclusive broadcast rights to the network's shows in India. The acquisition of the critically acclaimed Hulu original series The Handmaid's Tale for first airing in India also helped greatly in attracting more viewers for the channel and advertising the channel's content.

Closure
The channel's viewership began to gradually decline since early 2019, post the implementation of the new tariff order (NTO) by the Telecom Regulatory Authority of India which mandated that channels should not be bundled in packs, leading to a sharp fall in demand for niche channels.

Consequently, on 1 June 2020 Sony Pictures Networks India announced that effective from 30 June 2020 AXN would cease all operations in India for both its SD and HD feeds, with the majority of its programming moving to Sony's SVOD service, Sony Liv, thus ending the channel's existence of 21 years.

Fall in ad revenue during the COVID-19 pandemic and further decline in viewership due to the advent of SVOD platforms in India were also cited as reasons behind the channel's closure.

Programming 
AXN primarily aired shows from the U.S. and U.K. (including selected shows produced/distributed by Sony Pictures Television).
The following is a list of programming broadcast by the network:

Anime
Curious Play
Durarara!!
Gunsmith Cats
Ninku
You're Under Arrest

Comedy-Drama
BrainDead
Californication
Chuck
Limitless
Nurse Jackie
Sex and the City

Drama
24
The Agency
Alias
Billions
Blue Bloods
Boomtown
The Brave
Breaking Bad
Bull
Charlie's Angels
CHOSEN
Crouching Tiger, Hidden Dragon
CSI
CSI: Cyber
CSI: Miami
CSI: NY
Camelot
Damages
Dexter
Doubt
Elementary
The Firm
Gossip Girl
The Handmaid's Tale
Hannibal
Hawaii Five-0
House MD
Incorporated
Justified
Leverage
MacGyver
Madam Secretary
NCIS
NCIS: Los Angeles
NCIS: New Orleans
Nip/Tuck
NUMB3RS
Penny Dreadful
Ray Donovan
Reckless
Salvation
Scorpion
Seven Types of Ambiguity
Sheena
The Shield
Sherlock
Supernatural
Teen Wolf
Undercover
Vikings
V.I.P.
The Voice
You
Zoo

Reality
30 Seconds to Fame
101 Ways to Leave a Gameshow
The Amazing Race
American Ninja Warrior
The Apprentice Asia
Are You Hot?
The Bachelor: Australia
Breaking the Magician's Code: Magic's Biggest Secrets Finally Revealed
Britain's Next Top Model
The Contender
Criss Angel Mindfreak
Destination Truth
The Duke
Face Off
Fear Factor
Flipping Out
Genius Junior
Ghost Hunters
Scariest Places on Earth
The Glee Project
Little Big Shots
Guinness World Records Gone Wild
Guinness World Records Primetime
The Hero
The Immortal
Minute to Win It
The Real Housewives of New York City
Ripley's Believe It or Not!
So You Think You Can Dance
Survivor
Top Chef
Top Gear
Total Blackout
Total Wipeout
Twinning
Who Dares Wins
Wild On!
Wipeout
The Wright Stuff

Science Fiction
The 4400
7 Days
Andromeda
Beauty & the Beast
Caprica
Delete
Earth: Final Conflict
The End of the World
Extant
Falling Skies
Now and Again
Orphan Black
Tremors
Under the Dome

References

External links
 Official India website 

AXN
Television stations in Mumbai
Sony Pictures Television
Sony Pictures Entertainment
Television channels and stations established in 1999
Television channels and stations disestablished in 2020
Sony Pictures Networks India
Defunct television channels in India
1999 establishments in Maharashtra
Indian companies established in 1999
Indian companies disestablished in 2000